The Wolf Sea is the second novel of the five-part Oathsworn series by Scottish writer of historical fiction, Robert Low, released on 4 August 2008 through Harper. The novel was relatively well received.

Plot
The story revolves around Orm Rurikson, a young man who joined the crew of a Viking band as a child in the previous novel and is now their reluctant leader. This novel centres around the band pursuing Starkad, a villain based on the historical figure of legend, in an effort to reclaim their magical sword "Rune Serpent", which Starkad has stolen.

Reception
The novel received mostly positive acclaim from reviewers, with most citing Low's gritty realism as both the novels triumph and, for some, detraction.

In a favourable review for the Yorkshire Evening Post, the reviewer states that "it's narrated by Low with all the gritty, down-to-earth realism that breathed such life into his first novel" and comments that this novel is a good illustration as to "why historical fiction is one of today's most rapidly-growing genres". Andrew Baldwin writing for the Huddersfield Examiner mirrors this viewpoint, stating "there’s an assured tone to the writing and the author presents a convincing portrayal of harsh times.".

Judy Cleine, writing for the New Zealand-based Southland Times, had a somewhat different view on this realism, however, stating that "Low's exquisite descriptions of mindless slaughters and rapes, however, are not my particular cup of tea.", although does muse that "perhaps that is the author's intent.". Cleine also voiced concerns about the believability of who is "apparently educated enough to quote from 500-year-old non-religious Latin sources, and is also fluent in Greek and Arabic". She does, however, temper this with the fact that she found the novel "a great read if you like this mail-ripper sort of thing.".

References

External links
 

2008 British novels
Novels set in the Dark Ages
Scottish historical novels
Novels by Robert Low
HarperCollins books